The Ukrainian Cup 1973 was a football knockout competition conducting by the Football Federation of Ukrainian SSR and was known as the Ukrainian Cup.

The Cup started with the preliminary round on November 1, 1973, and involved the republican level non-amateur clubs. The main event started from the round of 16 on November 6, 1973, when the inter-republican clubs joined the competition such as Chornomorets, Metalist, and others, while some of them represented by their second squad. Dynamo Kyiv has chosen not to participate in it since its last winning season in 1948. Also the last season champions FC Avtomobilist Zhytomyr entered the competition at the Round of 16, however they were eliminated in the quarterfinals. Unlike the previous edition the tournament introduced a penalty shootout which replaced the method of a game replay. The competition concluded in two and half weeks in Kiev on November 18. Note that the tournament took place after the Soviet football season was over and was conducted in rather unsupported weather conditions as the cold period in Ukraine starts usually in September or October, depending on location.

Teams

Tournament distribution 
The competition was conducted among all 23 Ukrainian clubs of the 1973 Soviet Second League, Zone 1 and all 4 Ukrainian clubs of the 1973 Soviet First League.

Other professional teams 
The five Ukrainian professional teams in the Soviet Top League did not take part in the competition.
 1973 Soviet Top League (5): FC Dnipro Dnipropetrovsk, FC Dynamo Kyiv, FC Karpaty Lviv, FC Shakhtar Donetsk, FC Zorya Voroshylovhrad

Competition schedule

Preliminary round 
November 1, 1973

|}

First elimination round 
November 6, 1973

|}

Quarterfinals 
November 10, 1973

|}

Semifinals 
November 14, 1973

|}

Final 

|}
The final was held on November 18, 1973, in Kiev. Remarkable is the fact that the final involved participation of such players as Taras Shuliatytsky, Oleksandr Ischenko, and others well known players of that time.

Top goalscorers

See also 
 Soviet Cup
 Ukrainian Cup

References

External links 
 Information source 

1973
Cup
1973 domestic association football cups